Ana Ularu (born 26 June 1985) is a Romanian actress.

Biography
She is known for playing the role of Matilda in Outbound and West in Emerald City (2017).

Filmography

Film

Television

Awards and nominations

References

External links
 

1985 births
Living people
Actresses from Bucharest
Caragiale National University of Theatre and Film alumni
Romanian film actresses
Romanian television actresses
20th-century Romanian actresses
21st-century Romanian actresses